Gerald Joseph Duggan (10 July 191027 March 1992) was an Irish-born Australian character actor. Although he never achieved stardom, he was a familiar face in small roles in film and television, both in Australia and Britain. His trademarks were his Irish brogue, pronounced lisp and prominent jaw.

Early life
Duggan was born in Dublin in 1910. When he was 16 he moved to New York, where he had his early exposure to theatre acting. In the 1930s, he moved to Australia, where he settled, although he worked internationally.

Career
He was almost 50 when he made his first film, The Siege of Pinchgut (1959), a British production made in Australia, which was the last film from Ealing Studios. Duggan was nominated for the BAFTA Most Promising Newcomer Award for his role as Pat Fulton, but lost to the 13-year-old Hayley Mills in Tiger Bay.

Duggan played the title role in the 1986 children's television series Professor Poopsnagle's Steam Zeppelin. He appeared in many other television series in Australia and Britain, such as A Country Practice, Mother and Son, The Flying Doctors, Skyways, The Sullivans, Matlock Police, Number 96, Spyforce, Division 4, Boney, Skippy the Bush Kangaroo, The Avengers and Coronation Street.

Duggan continued to act on stage in between film and television commitments. In 1964, he appeared in the British debut of Samuel Beckett's play The Old Tune. In a role he regarded as the high point of his stage career, he played the role of McLeavy in the 1966 London revival of Joe Orton's Loot, which transferred to the Criterion Theatre.

Later in life, he resided in Beacon Hill, New South Wales. He worked until his death in Sydney, on 27 March 1992.

Partial filmography
 The Siege of Pinchgut (1959) – Pat Fulton
 A Tongue of Silver (1959) - policeman
 On the Beach (1959) – Bit Part (uncredited)
 The Sundowners (1960) – Shearer
 Dentist on the Job (1961) – Commissionaire
 Go to Blazes (1962) – Fireman
 Serena (1962) – Norman Cole
 The L-Shaped Room (1962) – Bert
 The Servant (1963) – Waiter
 West 11 (1964) – Father Dominic
 Goldfinger (1964) – Hawker, James Bond’s golf caddie
 Ned Kelly (1970) - Father O'Hea
 Ride a Wild Pony (1975) – Train Engineer
 Mad Dog Morgan (1976) – Martin
 The Devil's Playground (1976) – Brother Hanrahan
 The Singer and the Dancer (1977) – the Doctor
 The Picture Show Man (1977) – the Hall Secretary
 The Mango Tree (1977) – Scanlon
 Newsfront (1978) – Len's father
 My Brilliant Career (1979) - Squatter
 The Last of the Knucklemen (1979) – Old Arthur
 Slippery Slide (1980) 
 Bliss (1985) – neighbour 1
 Dark Age (1987) – Joe Blunt

References

External links
 

1910 births
1992 deaths
Male actors from Dublin (city)
Australian male stage actors
Australian male film actors
Australian male television actors
Irish emigrants to Australia
20th-century Australian male actors